Peter Nigel Tripp Unwin FRS is a British scientist at the MRC Laboratory of Molecular Biology, where he was Head of the Neurobiology Division from 1992 until 2008. He is currently also Emeritus Professor of Cell Biology at the Scripps Research Institute.

Life
Nigel Unwin was born in New Zealand. He was a Ph.D. student in the Department of Metallurgy Cambridge University from 1965–68, and then took a position at the MRC Laboratory of Molecular Biology from 1968 to 1980. He was Professor of Cell Biology at Stanford University from 1980 to 1987. In 1988 he returned to the MRC Laboratory of Molecular Biology, taking also a joint appointment at the Scripps Research Institute.

Works
Unwin N (2015), "Experiments in electron microscopy: from metals to nerves" Physica Scripta 90:048002
Zuber B, Unwin N (2013), "The structure and superorganization of acetylcholine receptor-rapsyn complexes" Proceedings of the National Academy of Sciences 110:10622-10627
Unwin N, Fujiyoshi Y (2012), "Gating movement of acetylcholine receptor caught by plunge-freezing" Journal of Molecular Biology 422:617-634
O'Brien J, Unwin N (2006), "Organization of spines on the dendrites of Purkinje cells" Proceedings of the National Academy of Sciences 103:1575-1580
Unwin N (2005), "Refined structure of the nicotinic acetylcholine receptor at 4Å resolution", Journal of Molecular Biology 346:967-989
Miyazawa A, Fujiyoshi Y, Unwin N (2003), "Structure and gating mechanism of the acetylcholine receptor pore" Nature 423:949-955
Unwin N (1995), "Acetylcholine receptor channel imaged in the open state" Nature 373:37-43
Berriman J, Unwin N (1994), "Analysis of transient structures by cryo-microscopy combined with rapid mixing of spray droplets" Ultramicroscopy 56:241-252
Toyoshima C, Unwin N (1988), "Ion channel of acetylcholine receptor reconstructed from images of postsynaptic membranes" Nature 336:247-250
Toyoshima C, Unwin N (1988), "Contrast transfer for frozen-hydrated specimens: determination from pairs of defocussed images" Ultramicroscopy 25:279-292
Brisson A, Unwin P N T (1985), "Quaternary structure of the acetylcholine receptor" Nature 315:474-477
Unwin P N T, Milligan R A (1982), "A large particle associated with the perimeter of the nuclear pore complex" Journal of Cell Biology 93:63-75
Unwin P N T, Zampighi G (1980), "Structure of the junction between communicating cells" Nature 283:545-549
Unwin P N T (1977), "Three-dimensional model of membrane-bound ribosomes obtained by electron microscopy" Nature 269:118-122
Henderson R, Unwin P N T (1975), "Three-dimensional model of purple membrane obtained by electron microscopy" Nature 257:28-32
Unwin P N T, Henderson R (1975), "Molecular structure determination by electron microscopy of unstained crystalline specimens" Journal of Molecular Biology 94:425-440
Unwin P N T (1971), "Phase contrast and interference microscopy with the electron microscope" Phil. Trans. Roy. Soc. Lond. B261:95-104

Honors
Unwin was elected a Fellow of the Royal Society (FRS) in 1983, and of Trinity College, Cambridge in 1987. He is an Honorary Fellow of the Royal Microscopical Society. His awards include the  Rosenstiel Award for Basic Medical Research (1991), the Louis-Jeantet Prize for Medicine (1996), the  Gregori Aminoff Prize in Crystallography (1999), and the Royal Society Croonian Lecture and Medal (2000).

References

External links
home page

British neuroscientists
Fellows of the Royal Society
Fellows of Trinity College, Cambridge
Scripps Research faculty
Stanford University Department of Biology faculty
Living people
Year of birth missing (living people)